In atmospheric science, geostrophic flow is the theoretical wind that would result from an exact balance between the Coriolis force and the pressure gradient force. This condition is called geostrophic equilibrium or geostrophic balance (also known as  geostrophy). The geostrophic wind is directed parallel to isobars (lines of constant pressure at a given height). This balance seldom holds exactly in nature. The true wind almost always differs from the geostrophic wind due to other forces such as friction from the ground. Thus, the actual wind would equal the geostrophic wind only if there were no friction (e.g. above the atmospheric boundary layer) and the isobars were perfectly straight. Despite this, much of the atmosphere outside the tropics is close to geostrophic flow much of the time and it is a valuable first approximation. Geostrophic flow in air or water is a zero-frequency inertial wave.

Origin

A useful heuristic is to imagine air starting from rest, experiencing a force directed from areas of high pressure toward areas of low pressure, called the pressure gradient force. If the air began to move in response to that force, however, the Coriolis "force" would deflect it, to the right of the motion in the northern hemisphere or to the left in the southern hemisphere. As the air accelerated, the deflection would increase until the Coriolis force's strength and direction balanced the pressure gradient force, a state called  geostrophic balance. At this point, the flow is no longer moving from high to low pressure, but instead moves along isobars. Geostrophic balance helps to explain why, in the northern hemisphere, low-pressure systems (or cyclones) spin counterclockwise and high-pressure systems (or anticyclones) spin clockwise, and the opposite in the southern hemisphere.

Geostrophic currents

Flow of ocean water is also largely geostrophic. Just as multiple weather balloons that measure pressure as a function of height in the atmosphere are used to map the atmospheric pressure field and infer the geostrophic wind, measurements of density as a function of depth in the ocean are used to infer geostrophic currents. Satellite altimeters are also used to measure sea surface height anomaly, which permits a calculation of the geostrophic current at the surface.

Limitations of the geostrophic approximation

The effect of friction, between the air and the land, breaks the geostrophic balance. Friction slows the flow, lessening the effect of the Coriolis force. As a result, the pressure gradient force has a greater effect and the air still moves from high pressure to low pressure, though with great deflection. This explains why high-pressure system winds radiate out from the center of the system, while low-pressure systems have winds that spiral inwards.

The geostrophic wind neglects frictional effects, which is usually a good approximation for the synoptic scale instantaneous flow in the midlatitude mid-troposphere. Although ageostrophic terms are relatively small, they are essential for the time evolution of the flow and in particular are necessary for the growth and decay of storms. Quasigeostrophic and semigeostrophic theory are used to model flows in the atmosphere more widely. These theories allow for divergence to take place and for weather systems to then develop..

Formulation

Newton's Second Law can be written as follows if only the pressure gradient, gravity, and friction act on an air parcel, where bold symbols are vectors:

Locally this can be expanded in Cartesian coordinates, with a positive u representing an eastward direction and a positive v representing a northward direction. Neglecting friction and vertical motion, as justified by the Taylor–Proudman theorem, we have:

Assuming geostrophic balance, the system is stationary and the first two equations become:

By substituting using the third equation above, we have:

with Z the height of the constant pressure surface (geopotential height), satisfying

This leads us to the following result for the geostrophic wind components (ug, vg):

The validity of this approximation depends on the local Rossby number. It is invalid at the equator, because f is equal to zero there, and therefore generally not used in the tropics.

Other variants of the equation are possible; for example, the geostrophic wind vector can be expressed in terms of the gradient of the geopotential Φ on a surface of constant pressure:

See also 
Balanced wind
Geostrophic current
Thermal wind
Gradient wind
Prevailing winds

References

External links 
 Geostrophic approximation
 Definition of geostrophic wind
 Geostrophic wind description

Fluid dynamics
Atmospheric dynamics